Maid Marian is a preserved narrow-gauge steam locomotive built in 1903, currently based at the Bala Lake Railway in North Wales.

Construction 
Maid Marian, works number 822 and subsequently named after a racehorse, was built in 1903 by the Hunslet Engine Company based in Leeds.

Working life 
Maid Marian spent its entire industrial life working at the Dinorwic Slate Quarry in North Wales. It operated alongside many Hunslet engines, including Holy War, Dolbadarn, George B, Red Damsel, Wild Aster, Alice and Irish Mail.

Preservation 
The Maid Marian Locomotive Fund was established in 1965 by a group of railway enthusiasts seeking to preserve a working locomotive from the Dinorwic Slate Quarry. The Quarry Manager recommended Maid Marian as the best locomotive then available. MMLF purchased the loco in 1965, taking possession in 1967. 

Maid Marian operated at the Bressingham Steam Museum from 1967 to 1971, before going to the Llanberis Lake Railway until 1975, and then to the Bala Lake Railway. It returned to Llanberis for the 2011 gala.

Israel Newton built a new boiler in 2006.

References

External links
Maid Marian Locomotive Fund

Individual locomotives of Great Britain
Preserved narrow gauge steam locomotives of Great Britain
Hunslet narrow gauge locomotives
0-4-0ST locomotives
2 ft gauge locomotives